Neil Henry is an American journalist and professor who is former dean of the University of California, Berkeley Graduate School of Journalism. He served as dean of the school between 2007 and 2011. During his deanship Henry accelerated the school's transition to digital skills training in its curriculum with the support of the Ford Foundation, while attracting three $2 million endowed faculty chairs from private donors.

Before becoming a professor at Berkeley in 1993, Henry was a reporter for 16 years for The Washington Post., where he served as a local, national and foreign correspondent based in Africa, and for Newsweek magazine. A five-time Pulitzer Prize nominee for his work at the Post, he has been awarded honors from the Associated Press, the Robert F. Kennedy Memorial, and the John S. and John L. Knight Foundation for his reporting and writing.

He is the author of "Pearl's Secret", an autobiographical family history that explores issues of mixed African American and White American heritage. The book was a finalist for the title of best nonfiction book by the Bay Area Book Reviewers Association in 2001. He also is the author of 2007's "American Carnival: Journalism Under Siege in an Age of New Media,"  which examines the economic and cultural forces challenging the practice of journalism in the digital era.

Between 2012 until his retirement from the faculty in 2016, Henry, a 1977 graduate in politics from Princeton University, and holder of a 1978 Master's Degree from Columbia University's Graduate School of Journalism, served as director of the Oral History Center of UC Berkeley's Bancroft Library.

References

External links
Neil Henry's Faculty webpage at UC Berkeley J-School

Year of birth missing (living people)
Living people
American male journalists
University of California, Berkeley Graduate School of Journalism faculty
Princeton University alumni
Columbia University Graduate School of Journalism alumni